Domer may refer to:

 a nickname for an alumnus of the University of Notre Dame, South Bend, Indiana, U.S.
 the original mascot (a turtle) of the Rogers Centre, Toronto, Canada
 the nickname for alumni of the State University of New York Maritime College, U.S.
 the nickname of Twitch streamer Trainwreckstv

See also
 Chilthorne Domer, a village in Somerset, England
 Dome (disambiguation)
 Dormer, roof structure